The Third Battle of Tuxpan was one of the three small battles of the Mexican–American War to occur in Tuxpan, Mexico. The engagement occurred on June 30, 1847, between Mexican troops and or militia and an American landing force from the Mosquito Fleet under Matthew C. Perry. Not much is known but a skirmish was fought, ending in the deaths of one U.S. man, and another who died two or three days later. Five other men were wounded, not including the said sixth man who died later on. At least four of the wounded Americans were made casualties by a gunpowder barrel explosion, caused by an unknown source. Mexican casualties are unknown. The United States blockade of Tuxpan continued on.

See also
 First Battle of Tuxpan

References
 Nevin, David; editor, The Mexican War (1978)
 Bauer, K. Jack, The Mexican–American War 1846–48

External links
 Roll of Honor - U.S. Casualties of Naval Actions in the War with Mexico

Naval battles of the Mexican–American War
Mosquito Fleet Campaign
United States Marine Corps in the 18th and 19th centuries
June 1847 events